Mariano Fernando González (born December 31, 1980 in Rosario) is an Argentine football defender. He currently plays for Argentino de Rosario in the Argentine lower leagues.

González started his career in 1999 at Rosario Central in the Primera Division Argentina. In 2003, he was sold to Tiro Federal, in 2005 he helped them to achieve promotion to the Primera for the first time in their history. Later that year he was sold to OFI Crete.

External links
 Mariano Fernando González at BDFA.com.ar 

1980 births
Living people
Footballers from Rosario, Santa Fe
Argentine footballers
Association football defenders
Rosario Central footballers
Tiro Federal footballers